Leon Krijgsman (born June 17th 1973) is a Dutch singer. He is also active as television host and actor.

Biography

Between 1999 and 2009 Leon hosted programs for the Dutch Fox Kids and Jetix channels, of which one example is "Pokémon Flippo Update". In most of his programs he is known for not only hosting the program but also playing at least one additional character.

Discography 
(among others)
 2018: "1 Miljoen Schoenen"

References 

1973 births
Living people
Dutch pop singers